The council of the City of Cape Town in the Western Cape, South Africa is elected every five years by a system of mixed-member proportional representation. Half of the councillors are elected by first-past-the-post voting from individual wards, while the other half are appointed from party lists so that the total number of party representatives is proportional to the number of votes received. By-elections are held to replace the councillors elected by wards if a vacancy occurs.

Results 
The following table shows the composition of the council after past elections and floor-crossing periods.

December 2000 election

The current form of the City of Cape Town was created in 2000 by merging the six transitional municipalities in the Cape Town metropolitan area (Cape Town/Central, South Peninsula, Blaauwberg, Tygerberg, Oostenberg and Helderberg) and the overarching Cape Metropolitan Council. The council of the new municipality consisted of 200 members, 100 elected from wards and the other 100 from party lists. The election was held on 5 December 2000; the Democratic Alliance won a majority of 107 seats.

By-elections from December 2000 to October 2002
The following by-elections were held to fill vacant ward seats in the period between the election in December 2000 and the floor crossing period in October 2002.

October 2002 floor crossing

In terms of the Eighth Amendment of the Constitution and the judgment of the Constitutional Court in United Democratic Movement v President of the Republic of South Africa and Others, in the period from 8–22 October 2002 councillors had the opportunity to cross the floor to a different political party without losing their seats.

In the Cape Town city council, the Democratic Alliance (DA) lost 31 councillors to the New National Party (NNP), which had formerly been part of the DA. The DA also lost 3 councillors to the African National Congress (ANC), 1 to the Universal Party and 1 who became an independent. The sole councillor of the Inkatha Freedom Party (IFP) also crossed to the NNP. The ANC and the NNP formed a coalition which held a majority of 112 seats.

By-elections from October 2002 to August 2004
The following by-elections were held to fill vacant ward seats in the period between the floor crossing periods in October 2002 and September 2004.

September 2004 floor crossing

Another floor-crossing period occurred on 1–15 September 2004. 23 of the 32 NNP councillors crossed to the ANC, giving the ANC a majority of 104 seats. A further 4 NNP councillors crossed to the ID. 2 councillors of the African Christian Democratic Party (ACDP) crossed to the Federation of Democrats, a new party.

By-elections from September 2004 to February 2006
The following by-elections were held to fill vacant ward seats in the period between the floor crossing periods in September 2004 and the election in March 2006.

March 2006 election

At the election of 1 March 2006, the city council was expanded to 210 members with the addition of 5 new wards and 5 new PR list councillors. No party obtained a majority, with the Democratic Alliance (DA) winning 90 seats, the African National Congress (ANC) 81, and the new Independent Democrats (ID) 23.

After much negotiation, a seven-party governing coalition was formed, consisting of the DA, the African Christian Democratic Party (ACDP), the Africa Muslim Party (AMP), the United Democratic Movement (UDM), the Freedom Front Plus (VF+), the United Independent Front (UIF), and the Universal Party (UP). The coalition held 105 seats, exactly half of the council, compared to the 104 seats held by the ANC and ID together. The single councillor from the Pan Africanist Congress abstained from the election of the mayor.

By-elections from March 2006 to August 2007
The following by-elections were held to fill vacant ward seats in the period between the election in March 2006 and the floor crossing period in September 2007.

September 2007 floor crossing

The final floor-crossing period occurred on 1–15 September 2007; floor-crossing was subsequently abolished in 2008 by the Fifteenth Amendment of the Constitution. In the Cape Town city council, the ID lost three councillors to the new National People's Party (NPP), two to the DA and one to the new Social Democratic Party. The UDM and the UIF each lost one councillor to the DA, and the AMP lost one councillor to the NPP. Control of the council was not affected because the ID had joined the governing coalition earlier in the year.

By-elections from September 2007 to May 2011
The following by-elections were held to fill vacant ward seats in the period between the floor crossing period in September 2007 and the election in May 2011.

May 2011 election

At the election of 18 May 2011, the council was expanded to 221 members with the addition of 6 new wards and 5 new PR list seats. The Democratic Alliance won a majority of 135 seats.

2011 mayoral election

By-elections from May 2011 to August 2016
The following by-elections were held to fill vacant ward seats in the period between the elections in May 2011 and August 2016.

August 2016 election

At the election of 3 August 2016, the council was expanded to 231 members with the addition of 5 new wards and 5 new PR list seats. The Democratic Alliance won a majority of 154 seats.

2016 mayoral election

By-elections from August 2016 to November 2021
The following by-elections were held to fill vacant ward seats in the period between the elections in August 2016 and November 2021.

November 2018 mayoral election

On 31 October 2018, incumbent Mayor Patricia de Lille resigned. An election was held on 6 November 2018 to determine her successor. It was subsequently won by former Mayor, Dan Plato. The candidates nominated were:

Dan Plato (Democratic Alliance), former Provincial Minister of Community Safety (2011 - 2018); former Member of the Western Cape Provincial Parliament (2011 - 2018); former Mayor of Cape Town (2009 - 2011)
Xolani Sotashe (African National Congress), incumbent Leader of the African National Congress in the Cape Town City Council; Mayoral candidate in 2016; Member of the Cape Town City Council (2000 - present)
Grant Haskin (African Christian Democratic Party), incumbent Leader of the African Christian Democratic Caucus (2016–present); former Deputy Mayor of Cape Town (2007 - 2009);  former Member of the Western Cape Provincial Parliament

The results were as follows.

November 2021 election

The Democratic Alliance won a reduced majority of 136 seats. This was later reduced to 135 seats when after a 7-month legal battle and a recount it was announced on May 26 that the Democratic Alliance had been misallocated a seat that should have been awarded to Cape Independence Party, giving the Cape Independence Party a second seat.

2021 mayoral election

By-elections from November 2021
The following by-elections were held to fill vacant ward seats in the period since the election in November 2021.

In ward 56, the DA councillor resigned in November 2022. The DA failed to nominate a candidate in time for the February by-election, which was contested by parties including Good, Al Jama-ah, Economic Freedom Fighters, and the Patriotic Alliance (PA). The PA won the ward with 41% of the vote.

Notes

References

Cape Town
Elections
Elections in the Western Cape